Oskaloosa Township is a township in Jefferson County, Kansas, USA.  As of the 2000 census, its population was 2,142.

Geography
Oskaloosa Township covers an area of 57.61 square miles (149.21 square kilometers); of this, 0.1 square miles (0.25 square kilometers) or 0.17 percent is water. The streams of Burr Oak Branch, Honey Creek, and Little Buck Creek run through this township.

Cities and towns
 Oskaloosa (the county seat)

Adjacent townships
 Jefferson Township (northeast)
 Union Township (east)
 Sarcoxie Township (southeast)
 Rural Township (south)
 Kentucky Township (southwest)
 Fairview Township (west)
 Ozawkie Township (west)

Cemeteries
The township contains two cemeteries: Pleasant View and Plum Grove.

Major highways
 U.S. Route 59
 K-16
 K-92

Airports and landing strips
 Flying T Airport
 Shomin Airport

References
 U.S. Board on Geographic Names (GNIS)
 United States Census Bureau cartographic boundary files

External links
 US-Counties.com
 City-Data.com

Townships in Jefferson County, Kansas
Townships in Kansas